Jonathan Beresford (born 12 April 1992), better known as Jono Carroll, is an Irish professional boxer who challenged for the IBF junior-lightweight title in 2019.

Professional career
Carroll began his pro career while in Australia in 2012. After building a 2–0 record he returned home to Dublin where he began fighting under Paschal "Packie" Collins, out of Celtic Warrior Gym, Blanchardstown.

Irish debut
Carroll made his Irish professional debut in November 2014, when he faced Declan Geraghty at the 3Arena. On the undercard of Matthew Macklin vs. Jorge Sebastian Heiland, promoter Eddie Hearn confirmed that the winner would earn a slot at the following month's Prizefighter tournament in London. Carroll and Geraghty went on to produce 'Fight of the Night', in a bout which ended in the fourth round when Geraghty was disqualified for persistent use of the head, that same fight would go on to win Irish fight of the year.

Prizefighter champion
Carroll really stepped into the limelight when he accepted the invitation and became Prizefighter champion in December. The Dubliner was a relative unknown to British audiences when he defied the odds to defeat Stephen Foster, Gary Buckland, and Michael Devine to take the lightweight title. Carroll subsequently signed a promotional deal with Eddie Hearn and Matchroom Sport.

Following Prizefighter
Despite being booked to appear on the undercard of teammate Spike O'Sullivan vs. Chris Eubank Jr, Carroll accepted a different fight at just a week's notice. On the Wladimir Klitschko vs. Tyson Fury card in Düsseldorf, Carroll agreed to the longest bout of his career so far, a ten rounder with Miguel Gonzalez. Despite the timing, Carroll outclassed the Honduran from start to finish, winning every round on the way to a unanimous decision victory. "I just went out there and enjoyed myself," he told Sky Sports afterwards. "Because I never fought 10 rounds, I wanted to see what it was all about. I wanted to get through without any injuries. I'm pretty proud of that."

Carroll vs. Quigg 
On March 7, 2020, Carroll fought former world champion Scott Quigg. Carroll dominated Quigg over the whole fight and managed to stop him in the eleventh round to earn the TKO victory.

Carroll vs. Hughes 
In his next fight, Carroll fought Maxi Hughes. While Carroll was a big favorite, Hughes managed to narrowly outbox Carroll and win the fight in a major upset via unanimous decision.

Carroll vs. Vences 
On September 11, 2021, Carroll fought Andy Vences, then ranked as #7 at super featherweight by the WBA. Carroll won the fight via majority decision, with the scorecards reading 97-93, 97-93 and 95-95 in his favour.

Professional boxing record

References

External links

Jono Carroll - Profile, News Archive & Current Rankings at Box.Live

1992 births
Living people
Irish male boxers
Lightweight boxers
Southpaw boxers
Sportspeople from County Dublin